Midi E 3301 was a prototype electric locomotive of Class E 3300 designed for the Chemins de fer du Midi, France. Because of poor performance, it was refused by the Compagnie du Midi and was re-deployed to Swiss railways. On 1 May 1919, it was classified Fb 2/5 11001 and, in 1920, it became experimental locomotive Be 2/5 11001 of the Swiss Federal Railways (SBB).

Overview

Many lines of the Midi network being mountain lines, the company began an electrification programme in 1909. The system chosen was single phase alternating current at 12 kV and 16⅔ Hz.

Six prototype locomotives were ordered for the Perpignan - Villefranche-de-Conflent line. They were:
    E 3001 from Thomson and General Electric
    E 3101 from AEG and Henschel
    E 3201 from Westinghouse, later SNCF 1C1 3900 
    E 3301 from Brown-Boveri and SLM Winterthur 
    E 3401 from Ateliers du Nord et de l'Est 
    E 3501 from Schneider

The E 3301 locomotive was expected to perform the following tasks:
    Haul a 400-ton train on a 2.2% gradient
    Haul a 300-ton train at 40 km/h on a 2.2% gradient
    Haul a 100-ton train at 60 km/h on a 2.2% gradient 
    Be equipped with an electric brake for descents

Technical details

The companies SLM Winterthur and Brown-Boveri built the E3301 locomotive in 1910-1911. Power was provided by two large Déri repulsion motors that filled almost the entire engine room. The speed and direction of the motors were controlled by brush-shifting, allowing the train to start without jolting. The motors were powered at 1,250 V by two traction transformers connected in parallel. The power of the motors was transmitted to the central axle by two inclined rods, without gears, then to the other drive axles by coupling rods.

Trials
The E 3301, equipped with auxiliary transformer windings for 15 kV operation, was tested on the Spiez - Frutigen line. During these tests, some design faults became apparent. On 18 February 1912, the locomotive was transferred to Perpignan and trials continued until 16 August 1912. The locomotive was unable to deliver the required performance, as was the case for two other machines. Another gave partial satisfaction, but only E 3201 was fully satisfactory. The Midi also ordered railcars E ABD 1 to 30, which became Class Z 4900 of the SNCF.

Modifications

The Midi returned the locomotive to its makers, who used it as a test vehicle for individual axle drive. This had already been used for moderate powers and speeds, but experience was lacking for the transmission of higher powers. One motor was connected to an axle through a Tschanz drive. The second motor was connected to an axle through a BBC-Buchli. The third driving axle was left unpowered. As a result, the wheel arrangement changed from 1C1 to 2Bo1. Similar tests were done later on the SBB-CFF-FFS Ae 4/8.

Service in Switzerland
The modified locomotive was first tested on the Lötschberg railway line. On 1 August 1918, it was officially handed over to the Bern–Lötschberg–Simplon railway (BLS) under number 2B1 10001 for the start of the tests.

Until 1919, the machine was used to haul passenger trains on the Thun - Spiez line. On 1 May 1919 it entered permanently the service of the SBB under the number Fb 2/5 10001. From the energizing of the line from Berne - Spiez on 7 July 1919, it began to haul passenger trains.  By the end of 1919, it had travelled 24,500 kilometres. In 1920, when it became Be 2/5 11001, it travelled a further 5,500 kilometres and, by 1921, the total was 35,300 kilometres. Around this time, the locomotive was nicknamed Viktor.

SBB were receiving new and better locomotives, so they looked for a new assignment for Viktor. On 1 June 1922, it was assigned to the Erstfeld depot to haul trains on the Erstfeld - Arth - Goldau and Erstfeld - Lucerne lines and covered an average daily distance of 224 km. Between  1923 and 1924, it also pulled passenger trains on the Gotthard line between Lucerne and Bellinzona. In 1924 it travelled only 2,000 kilometres, apparently because of accident damage.

In 1925, Viktor was transferred to the Lucerne depot and hauled trains to Rotkreuz (in the Canton of Zug), Zurich and Arth-Goldau and still travelled 202 kilometres daily average. Also in 1925, the train-heating boiler was replaced by a 1,000 volt electric train supply. From 1 October 1926, its use declined and it was used only occasionally on short freight trains. In May 1927, traffic to Rotkreuz and Arth-Goldau increased and Viktor was put back into service and travelled 135 km every day.

On 15 May 1928, the locomotive Be 3/5 12201 resumed its services and Viktor was relegated to shunting duties at Zurich depot. It covered only about 7,000 kilometres in 1928. In 1929, the mileage dropped to 592 km.

Final years
In 1929, Viktor was converted into a self-propelled welding wagon Xe 1/5 n° 99999 which later became XTe 1/5 n° 99999. It was withdrawn on 17 September 1937 and scrapped in December 1937.

References

Further reading
    Yves Machefert-Tassin, Fernand Nouvion, Jean Woimant, Histoire de la traction électrique. tome I : des origines à 1940, Éditions La Vie du Rail, 1980, 561p.
    Lucien-Maurice Vilain, Évolution du matériel moteur et roulant de la Cie du Midi : 19855 à 1934 (fusion P.O. Midi), Édition Picador, 1979, 286p.

1′C1′ locomotives
Standard gauge electric locomotives of France
Electric locomotives of Switzerland
15 kV AC locomotives
SLM locomotives
Brown, Boveri & Cie locomotives
Chemins de fer du Midi
Passenger locomotives